James M. Seibert (February 3, 1847 – January 23, 1935) was an American politician. He served as the State Treasurer of Missouri from 1885 to 1889.

References

State treasurers of Missouri
Missouri Democrats
1847 births
1935 deaths